John Wallace Winborne (1884–1966) was an American jurist who served on the North Carolina Supreme Court from 1937–1962, including service as chief justice from 1956-1962.

Born in Chowan County, North Carolina, Winborne graduated from the University of North Carolina at Chapel Hill, moved to Marion, North Carolina around 1910, and joined the law firm of J. Will Pless. He became active in politics, serving as chairman of the North Carolina Democratic Party at one time. Winborne was also a mason and rose to become grand master of the state Masonic Lodge. He was appointed by Gov. Clyde R. Hoey to the state's highest court as an associate justice when the court's size was increased from five to seven justices in 1937. Gov. Luther Hodges appointed Winborne chief justice in 1956 after Chief Justice Barnhill retired.

References

External links
Charles Milton Shaffer Papers
John Wallace Winborne Collection
Dameron, Burgin and Parker

Chief Justices of the North Carolina Supreme Court
North Carolina Democrats
1884 births
1966 deaths
20th-century American judges
People from Chowan County, North Carolina
People from Marion, North Carolina